The Wexford People is a local or regional newspaper published weekly every Tuesday in County Wexford, Ireland. The newspaper contains stories relating primarily to the town of Wexford and its surrounding area, as well as stories relating to County Wexford.

Independent News & Media
Newspapers published in the Republic of Ireland
Mass media in County Wexford
Weekly newspapers published in Ireland
People